Coleopterida is a superorder of insects consisting of the orders Coleoptera and Strepsiptera. It is established as the sister group of Neuropterida based on phylogenetic analysis of DNA sequence data. The grouping is also supported by morphological data.

References

 
Endopterygota
Insect superorders